Abdullah Ibn Humaid (1908–1981) also known as Abdullah bin Muhammad bin Humaid was the Chief Justice of Saudi Arabia and Imam of the Great Mosque of Mecca. He was succeeded as Great Mosque imam by his son 
Salih bin Abdullah al Humaid.

He is the author of Jihad in the Quran and Sunnah.

See also
 Abd Al-Aziz Fawzan Al-Fawzan
 Saleh Al-Fawzan
 Muhammad Taqi-ud-Din al-Hilali
 Muhammad Muhsin Khan
 Muhammad bin Jamil Zeno

References

1908 births
1981 deaths
20th-century Saudi Arabian politicians
Saudi Arabian imams
Saudi Arabian Sunni Muslims
Sharia judges
Saudi Arabian judges
20th-century Saudi Arabian lawyers